Santiago de Paucaray is one of 11 districts of the Sucre Province in the Ayacucho region in Peru.

Population
The population of Santiago de Paucaray (2005 census) is 1,030 people, 495 men and 535 women.

Ethnic groups 
The people in the district are mainly indigenous citizens of Quechua descent. Quechua is the language which the majority of the population (84.16%) learnt to speak in childhood, 15.84% of the residents started speaking using the Spanish language (2007 Peru Census).

Administrative division
The populated places in the district are:
 Santiago de Paucaray
 Autama
 Chaquiccocha
 pampa Estancia
 Ccallhuaniso
 Ccotani
 Atihuara
 Matara
 Santa Rosa de Ccara Ccara
 Chullhua
 Hauytarumi
 Parhuanca

References